Telsen Department is a  department of Chubut Province in Argentina.

The provincial subdivision has a population of about 1,788 inhabitants in an area of 19,893 km², and its capital city is Telsen, which is located around 1,494 km from the Capital federal.

Settlements
Gan Gan
Telsen
Chacay Oeste
Colonia Agricola Sepaucal
Tres Banderas
Laguna Fria
Bajada del Diablo
Sierra Chata
Mallin Grande

References

Departments of Chubut Province